The Dawna Range, also known as Dawna Hills, is a mountain range in eastern Burma and northwestern Thailand. Its northern end is located in Kayah State where it meets the Daen Lao Range, a subrange of the Shan Hills. The range runs southwards along Kayin State as a natural border with Mon State in the west forming parallel ranges to the northern end of the Tenasserim Hills further south and southeast. The Dawna Range extends east of the Salween southwards from the Shan Hills for about 350 km, at the western limit of the Thai highlands.  Its southern end reaches the Thai-Myanmar border in the Umphang area, entering Thailand west of Kamphaeng Phet. The Thungyai Naresuan Wildlife Sanctuary is in the Thai side of the range.

Some geographers include the Dawna Range as the western and the southern part of the Thanon Thong Chai Range (เทือกเขาถนนธงชัย). The highest point of the range is 2,080 m high Mela Taung; 2,005 m high Mulayit Taung is located at the southern end of the range.

Ecology
The Dawna Range provides a habitat for the tiger, the wild Asian elephant and Fea's muntjak. Endangered species in the area are the plain-pouched hornbill and Gurney's pitta. There are other rare species some of which have only recently been discovered.

This narrow steep-sided range is geologically and ecologically homogeneous with the neighboring head of the Tenasserim Hills and the Karen Hills further north, so that frequently it is considered as a whole under the name "Dawna
Tenasserim" or as "Kayah-Karen/Tenasserim". The Dawna Range is covered with tropical and subtropical moist broadleaf forests. The Kayah-Karen montane rain forests that cover the mountains are part of the Kayah-Karen/Tenasserim moist forests ecoregion which is included in the Global 200 list of ecoregions identified by the World Wildlife Fund (WWF) as priorities for conservation.

Protected areas
Protected areas of the Dawna range are part of the Western Forest Complex.

Burma
Mulayit Wildlife Sanctuary

Thailand
Salawin National Park
Mae Moei National Park
Thungyai Naresuan Wildlife Sanctuary
Khao Laem National Park
Huai Kha Khaeng Wildlife Sanctuary
Khun Phawo National Park
Namtok Pha Charoen National Park
Taksin Maharat National Park
Lan Sang National Park
Khlong Wang Chao National Park
Khlong Lan National Park
Mae Wong National Park
Phu Toei National Park

History
In 1944 and 1945, at the time of the Japanese conquest of Burma during World War II, the eastern Dawna mountains provided a base from which the Karen troops led by Bo Mya fought against the Japanese Imperial Army on the side of the British.

Owing to the unrest in Burma and the human rights abuses by the Tatmadaw, some refugee camps have been established for the cross-border refugees in the Thai side of the range. The largest is the Mae La refugee camp, established in 1984 in Tha Song Yang District, Tak Province and currently houses over 40,000 refugees Landmines have been laid in the border area and this affects wildlife as well.

See also
Western Forest Complex
List of ecoregions in Burma

References

External links

Google Books, The Physical Geography of Southeast Asia
Kayah-Karen/Tenasserim Moist Forests
Tay Lay’s chopper mania
The Geology of Burma (Myanmar)
Picture of peak on the Thai side of the range
KNU - Forest policy 

 
Mountain ranges of Myanmar
Mountain ranges of Thailand